Alliance United Futbol Club is a Canadian semi-professional soccer club based in Markham and Scarborough, Ontario. The club was founded in 2017 to compete in League1 Ontario.  The club was formed as a partnership between two youth clubs - Markham FC and Wexford SC. It fields teams in both the men's and women's divisions of League1 Ontario.

Founders
The club was founded in 2017 as a joint partnership between clubs Markham FC and Wexford SC with the team playing out of Centennial College. The name Alliance United was initially meant to be a temporary with a 'name the team' initiative planned, but it ultimately remained the official name.

Markham FC

Markham FC is a youth soccer club in Markham, Ontario. It was founded in 1971 as the Markham Minor Soccer Club, before changing its name to the Markham Youth Soccer Club.

Wexford SC
Wexford SC is a youth soccer club in Scarborough in Toronto. It was founded in 1967 as the Buchanan Soccer Club and is the longest running club in Scarborough.

History
Alliance United joined the men's division of League1 Ontario for the 2018 season. They played their inaugural match on April 29, 2018 against North Mississauga SC at home, which they lost by a score of 1–0. They finished in 7th place in their debut season.  They improved to a 3rd-place finish in the 2019 season, but had a very poor showing in the playoffs where they lost 15–0 to FC London on aggregate in the semi-finals over the two-game series, due to being unable to field many of their best players, who missed the series due to college and university commitments, thereby having to rely on many youth players instead.  

In 2019, the club added a team in the League1 Ontario women's division. In their debut season, they finished in a three-way tie for fifth, but did not play in 2020 or 2021 due to the COVID-19 pandemic. In their return in 2022, they finished 6th in the regular season, but advanced to the Championship Final in the playoffs, where they were defeated by NDC Ontario. In addition, they advanced to the League1 Canada Women's Interprovincial Championship for 2022, as NDC Ontario was unable to compete due to player unavailability, where they finished in 3rd place, following a defeat to PLSQ side AS Laval in a penalty shootout in the semi-finals, before defeating League1 British Columbia side Varsity FC in the third-place match in another penalty shootout.

Seasons 
Men

Women

Notable former players
The following players have either played at the professional or international level, either before or after playing for the League1 Ontario team:

Men

Women

References

Association football clubs established in 2017
League1 Ontario teams
2017 establishments in Ontario
Scarborough, Toronto
Soccer clubs in Toronto
Sport in Markham, Ontario